Benjamin Alvord Jr. (May 15, 1860 – April 13, 1927) was an American soldier. He was the son of Benjamin Alvord, who was a scientist and a soldier.

Early life and career
Alvord was born in Vancouver, Washington, and graduated number seventeen of thirty-seven from the United States Military Academy in 1882. He was assigned to the 20th Infantry Regiment. He attended the Infantry and Cavalry School at Fort Leavenworth.

Alvord was an instructor at West Point and at the Infantry and Cavalry School. He served in the Philippines as a major in ordnance and as an adjutant. He served as adjutant general of the Department of Luzon. He was awarded the Silver Citation Star for his service.

Alvord was promoted to brigadier general and in May 1917 was the adjutant general of the American Expeditionary Forces during World War I. He was awarded the Distinguished Service Medal for his service during the war. He left Europe in 1918 due to illness. He subsequently was named Assistant Adjutant General of the Army in 1922. He served in this post until his retirement in 1924.

Death and legacy
Alvord died on April 13, 1927. He was buried at Arlington National Cemetery, in Arlington, Virginia.

Family
Alvord was married to Margaret McCleery, the daughter of Army chaplain J. B. McCleery. Margaret's sister Kate was the wife of Major General John Frank Morrison.

Awards
 Distinguished Service Medal
 Silver Citation Star

References

Further reading 
 "Alvord to Succeed Kerr at Capital", Los Angeles Times, August 4, 1922, Part I, p. 3.

External links
 

1860 births
1927 deaths
Burials at Arlington National Cemetery
Recipients of the Distinguished Service Medal (US Army)
United States Army generals of World War I
United States Military Academy alumni
People from Vancouver, Washington
United States Army generals
Recipients of the Silver Star